Biloziria is a big village (selo) in central Ukraine. It hosts the administration of Biloziria rural hromada, one of the hromadas of Ukraine.

History
The village is mentioned as a town in the "Tales about populated localities of Kiev Governorate" of 1864 by Lavrentiy Polkhylevych and the fact that existed before 1710.

Further reading
  (1972). Історіа міст і сіл Української CCP – Черкаська область (The History of Cities and Villages of the Ukrainian SSR – Cherkasy Oblast), Kiev.

References

External links
 
 

Villages in Cherkasy Raion